Matteo Giulio Bartoli (22 November 1873 in Labin/Albona – 23 January 1946 in Turin) was an Italian linguist from Istria (then a part of Austria-Hungary, today part of modern Croatia).

He obtained a doctorate at the University of Vienna, where his adviser was Wilhelm Meyer-Lübke, in 1898.  He was influenced by certain theories of the Italian philosopher Benedetto Croce and the German linguist Karl Vossler. He later also studied with Jules Gilliéron in Paris.  From Gilliéron he acquired a penchant for fieldwork, and from 1900 on he published numerous dialectological studies of Istrian dialects.

In 1907 he became professor of comparative history of classical and neo-Latin languages the Faculty of Letters at the University of Turin, where he served until his death.

His study on the Dalmatian language, Das Dalmatische (2 vol. 1906) is the only known complete description of the language, which is now extinct. It remains "the standard work on Dalmatian", and contains every known text in the language. Bartoli used data gathered in 1897 from the last speaker of Dalmatian, Tuone Udaina, who was killed in an explosives accident on 10 June 1898.

He also wrote Introduzione alla neolinguistica ("Introduction to neolinguistics", 1925) and Saggi di linguistica spaziale ("Essays in spatial linguistics", 1945) and was the teacher of Antonio Gramsci.

References

1873 births
1946 deaths
Linguists from Italy
Dalmatian language
People from Labin